Mun Ki-nam (born 1948) is a North Korean former footballer and football manager.

Early life
Born in Chongju, North Pyongan, the details of Mun's childhood are unclear. In a 2004 interview with The Dong-a Ilbo, Mun states that his father defected to South Korea during the Korean War, and that this had a negative impact on his life growing up in The North. He also stated that part of the reason for his defection to The South was to find his father, as well as his uncles. However, in another 2014 interview with Seoul Shinmun, he states that his father was executed for opposing the Communist Party when Mun was three years old.

Regardless, Mun moved to capital city Pyongyang at some point during his youth, either living with his mother and her new husband, or with his mother-in law.

After the Korean axe murder incident of 1976, people deemed "dangerous elements" were forced to relocate from major North Korean cities to the countryside, including Mun.

Playing career
Mun represented the North Korea national football team between 1969 and 1979. He was also called up for North Korea at the 1974 Asian Games.

Managerial career
Mun began his managerial career by coaching the North Korea national under-20 football team at the 1990 AFC Youth Championship. He also served as a coach of the unified Korea team at the 1991 FIFA World Youth Championship.

Defection and later life
After working at the DPR Korea Football Association's office in Gyeonggi, Mun defected to South Korea via China in January 2004 with his wife and four children. He went on to manage the University of Ulsan football team.

References

1948 births
Living people
People from Chongju
North Korean defectors
North Korean footballers
North Korea youth international footballers
North Korea international footballers
North Korean football managers
North Korea women's national football team managers
North Korea national football team managers
Association football forwards
Rodongja Sports Club players
Unpasan Sports Club players
Footballers at the 1974 Asian Games
Asian Games competitors for North Korea